Middleton is a rural locality in the Shire of Winton, Queensland, Australia. In the  Middleton had a population of 9 people.

Geography

Lying within the locality is the former site of Collingwood, a town that lost out in regional competition to its neighbour, Winton. It had been given up by about 1900.

The region in which Middleton lies is a circular zone that has been shown to be a crustal anomaly. Scientists from Geoscience Australia believe that it is an impact structure formed by an asteroid that struck the area about 300 million years ago. Final proof of this as the anomaly's genesis has not yet been found.

History
European exploration of the Middleton area began with explorer John McKinlay's expedition in search of the missing Burke and Wills expedition in 1862. McKinlay named a watercourse in the area Middleton Creek after his second-in-charge Thomas Middleton.

The Middleton Hotel was established at the creek crossing as a Cobb & Co changing station on the route between Winton and Boulia.

Middleton Provisional School opened on 1908 and closed on 1913. Another Middleton Provisional School opened in 1937 and closed circa 1943.

Middleton Post Office opened by March 1916 (a receiving office had been open from 1889) and closed in 1968.

At the 2006 census, Middleton and the surrounding area had a population of 121. In the  Middleton had a population of 9 people.

The 2016 film Goldstone was filmed in Middleton.

Heritage listings 

The Elderslie Homestead on the Winton-Boulia Road is a heritage-listed site.

Education
There are no schools in Middleton. Although the nearest primary and secondary school is Winton State School in Winton to the east, it is sufficiently distant that distance education and boarding school would be alternatives.

Facilities
The town has been mostly abandoned and now consists of the Middleton Hotel, campground and the disused hall.

References

Towns in Queensland
Shire of Winton
1916 establishments in Australia
Localities in Queensland